Badnam (English: Infamous) (Bengali: বদনাম)  is a 1990 Bengali drama film directed by Shibu Mitra and produced by Ms. Rupanjali.The film features actors Prosenjit Chatterjee, Neelam in the lead roles. Music of the film has been composed by Bappi Lahiri.

Plot 
Poor and honest man Haranath was entrapped by a corrupt person Mathur Ghosh. He commits suicide. Shankar, Haranath's son oaths to avenge for the wrongs done to Haranath. When he grows up, he also gets entrapped by Mathur Ghosh's friend and co-partner Sundar Banerjee who's also the local police head, Manotosh Banerjee's son even to the point he loses his lover Priya Dutta to him, the rich Prakash Dutta's daughter who also wanted to prove Haranath's innocence. But he doesn't let evil defeat him like his father while he avenges his death. He arrests Sundar and makes him confess in front of his father, that he got Mathur to entrap Haranath as a thief, took Priya away from him after framing him for using heroin in Priya's hotel where he was a singer and killing Mathur's daughter. Manotosh gets him and Mathur arrested in front of him and his mom while proving Haranath's innocence. Shankar and Priya finally get married.

Cast 
 Prosenjit Chatterjee as Shankar
 Neelam as Priya Dutta
 Shakti Kapoor as Keshto
 Shubhendu Chatterjee as Inspector Manotosh Banerjee
 Shakuntala Barua as Shankar's Mother
 Pallavi Chatterjee as Radha
 Soumitra Bannerjee as Sundar Banerjee
 Bankim Ghosh as Mathur Ghosh
 Tapendu Gangopadhyay as Prakash Dutta
 Ramen Roy Chowdhury as Haranath
 Sunny Deol as Darshan (Guest Appearance)

Soundtrack 
All songs were composed by Bappi Lahiri and the lyrics werer written by Pulak Bandopadhyay.

 "Jhal Legeche Amar Jhal Legeche" - Alka Yagnik
 "Priya Priya Tumi Je Amar Priya" - Amit Kumar, Sapna Mukherjee
 "Makhan Churi Chelebelay" - Anuradha Paudwal
 "Kaje Kiser Laaj" - Bappi Lahiri
 "Chokhe Chokhe Kotha Holo" - Asha Bhosle, Kumar Sanu
 "Kotodin Ashe Din Kete Jay" (Sad) - Alka Yagnik
 "Tumi Sobi Jano Antaryami" - Anuradha Paudwal.

References

External links
 

Bengali-language Indian films
1990 films
Films scored by Bappi Lahiri
1990s Bengali-language films
Indian drama films
Films directed by Shibu Mitra